Sheikh Haydar Astrakhani  was Khan of Astrakhan from 1538 through 1541. For uncertainties and additional information see the second part of List of Astrakhan khans.

Khans of Astrakhan
Year of death unknown
Year of birth unknown